Hogaya Dimaagh Ka Dahi is a 2015 Hindi-language comedy drama film directed by Fauzia Arshi and produced by Santosh Bhartiya and Fauzia Arshi for Daily Multimedia Limited. The film stars Kader Khan, Om Puri, Raajpal Yadav, Sanjay Mishra, Razak Khan, Vijay Patkar, Amita Nangia, Chitrashi Rawat, Bunty Chopra, Subhash Yadav, Danish Bhat and Amit J. It marked the last film appearance of Kader Khan

Plot 
The story is about how a father plots a situation for his irresponsible and spoilt sons so they are forced to undergo hardships of life, learn to value relationships and understand the harsh facts of life. Ishwar Singh Chauhan (Kader Khan) is on his death bed when he tells his three sons – Harry, Inder and Veeru (HIV) about a 'haveli' that he has left behind for them as his sole inheritance.

The drama and humor unfolds when they gets to know one family already resides there and meets Mirza Kishan Singh Joseph (Om Puri) and his family. The cat and mouse race begins and while in trying to get back the ‘haveli’,they encounters different people from different walks of life.

When Mirza Kishan Singh Joseph shows his adamance of not leaving the ‘haveli’ and asks them to get out, HIV then gets introduced by Masala (Raajpal Yadav) to Aashiq Ali Advocate (Sanjay Mishra) and Teeli Bhai (Razak Khan) who gives them tips and tricks in order to get back their property.

Cast 
 Kader Khan as Ishwar Singh Chauhan
 Om Puri as Mirza Kishan Singh Joseph
 Raajpal Yadav as Masala
 Sanjay Mishra as Aashiq Ali Advocate
 Razak Khan as Teeli Bhai
 Amita Nangia as Mujjee
 Vijay Patkar as Bawle
 Chitrashi Rawat as Sara
 Subhash Yadav as Pauwwa
 Amit J as Harry
 Imran Khan – Special Appearance
 Bunty Chopra as Inder
 Danish Bhat as Veeru
 Heaven as Gabbar

Soundtrack 

The soundtrack of the film album is composed by Fauzia Arshi and lyrics written by Shabbir Ahmed, Anis Ali Sabri, Ravi Chopra, poetry by Allama Iqbal, Amir Khusro and Krishan Bihari Noor.The music rights for the film are acquired by Zee Music Company.

 Track listing

Production

Development 
Producer –Director Fauzia Arshi makes her directorial debut with Hogaya Dimaagh Ka Dahi. It is produced by Santosh Bhartiya and Fauzia Arshi under the banner Daily Multimedia Limited. Since, it was a story written by herself, she decided to direct it without any second thoughts. She wrote the story and dialogues herself. Fauzia says, "the characters in the movie are created from her observation of people in her life. Such people exist in real life and I have grown up watching them." 
Santosh Bhartiya (Editor-in-Chief of Chauthi Duniya) wrote its screenplay keeping in mind the intricacies of the current society where kids are spoilt and then lose touch with reality as they grow into adulthood.

Filming 
Hogaya Dimaagh Ka Dahi is Fauzia Arshi’s first directorial venture. The major part of the film is shot in Kandaghat, Chail, Shimla in Himachal Pradesh and SarkhejRoza, Ahmedabad in Gujarat. 
Director was not satisfied with the already shotsufi song in the film ‘MaulaMaula’, she decided to go on floor once again. On 27 and 28 July, team Hogaya Dimaagh Ka Dahi shot the song under the able direction and choreography of Fauzia Arshi at SarkhejRoza in Ahmedabad with Shahbaz Khan.

References

External links

 Five comedians come together for Hogaya Dimaagh Ka Dahi
 India needs benevolent dictator to set it right: Om Puri
 Press Conference of HogayaDimaaghKaDahi : BollywoodHungama.com. 28 August 2015
 	HogayaDimaaghKaDahi: Kader Khan in Press Conference with Om Puri. Bhaskar.com. 28 August 2015
 Press Conference Film HogayaDimaaghKaDahi. Lehren.TV. 28 August 2015.
 Big B shares news of Kader Khan’s comeback to films. The Indian Express. 10 August 2015
 Amitabh Bachchan Announces Kader Khan’s Grand Comeback on Silver Screen. FocusNews.Com. 9 August 2015.
 Kader Khan back to films, says Big B on Twitter. DNA. 9 August 2015.
 Big B shares news of Kader Khan’s comeback to films. ABP Live. 10 August 2015.
 Veteran actor Kader Khan to make a comeback. The Free Press Journal. 15 August 2015.
 Amitabh Bachchan announces the return of veteran actor Kader Khan. The Times of India. 12 August 2015.
 Amitabh Bachchan announces return of veteran actor Kader Khan. Lokmarg.com. 12 August 2015. 
 "Main Ek Film Banana ChahtaHoon": Kader Khan. BollywoodHungama.com. 
 "Poore World Ne Mujhe Miss Kiya": Kader Khan. BollywoodHungama.com.
 Hasee Ka Badshah Kader Khan Hai : Santosh Bhartiya. BollywoodHungama.com.
 "Kader Khan talks to ABP News for his comeback film ‘HogayaDimaaghKaDahi". ABP Live.
 First Look – HogayaDimaaghKaDahi. Bollywood EveryDay. 13 July 2015
 Exclusive : HogayaDimaaghKaDahi :Kapil Sharma Threatened. IndiaGlitz.com. 14 July 2015
 सोशल मीडिया पर धूम मचाती फिल्म होगया दिमाग़ का दही
 बिग बी ने किया कादर खान की वापसी का स्वागत
 यह फिल्म बेहतर कॉमेडी के लिए याद की जाएगी: कादर खान 
 काश, कव्वाली मौला-मौला पर मैं एक्ट कर पाता: ओम पुरी
 मौला मेरे मौला गीत ने बनारस में फैले उन्माद को शांत कर दियाः रेडियो मंत्रा
 Hogaya Dimaagh Ka Dahi: Synopsis. MovieTalkies.com.
 First Look of HogayaDimaaghKaDahi. MuslimIssues.com. 16 July 2015. 
 Hogaya Dimaagh Ka Dahi Information
 Chitrashi Rawat For Hogaya Dimaagh Ka Dahi
 Movie Related Photos
 trailer on Daily motion
 रूहानी कव्वाली है मौला-मौला
 kader khan For Hogaya Dimaagh ka dahi
MOVIE: HOGAYA DIMAAGH KA DAHI (HDKD) – COMING 16TH OCTOBER

2015 films
2010s Hindi-language films
Films set in Delhi
Indian drama road movies
2010s drama road movies
2010s Urdu-language films
2015 drama films